Cricket Scotland, formerly known as the Scottish Cricket Union, is the governing body of the sport of cricket in Scotland. The body is based at the National Cricket Academy, Edinburgh.

The SCU was formed in 1908, but underwent a major restructuring in 2001 including a name change. It became an International Cricket Council member in 1994 as an Associate nation. It has three sub-associations: East of Scotland Cricket Association, Western District Cricket Union and the Aberdeenshire Cricket Association. Brian Adair served as president (1983) and chairman (1986).
Following a review into racism at Cricket Scotland the entire board resigned on 24 July 2022.

Structure
The governing body for cricket in Scotland is Cricket Scotland which was formed in 1908 as the Scottish Cricket Union, but re-structured in 2001. The work of Cricket Scotland includes the organisation and administration of national representative sides (senior and youth, men and women); the organisation of District/Area cricket; the organisation of national club cup competitions; the Scottish National Cricket Leagues; a national coaching programme for elite squads and at grass roots level; coach education; advice to members on relevant issues; and generally developing and promoting the game in Scotland. There are 150 cricket clubs affiliated to Cricket Scotland, but in total it is estimated that there are well over 250 clubs in Scotland.
 
Cricket Scotland employs three full-time and one part-time Cricket Development Officers covering the whole of Scotland. These Development officers work in association with local clubs, schools and associations in running coaching courses and coach education throughout the country, setting up leagues introducing new initiatives such as 'Inter-cricket' and 'Kwik- Cricket'.
 
The Scottish season runs from mid-April to early September, with almost all senior cricket being played on grass pitches. League cricket is mainly played on Saturdays whilst Sundays sees the majority of cup competitions played. Mid-week cricket is also becoming more popular for friendly matches as the demand for pitches at weekends grows.

Name change
After the organisation was founded in 1908, it was known as the Scottish Cricket Union. This was renamed as Cricket Scotland in 2001.

Hall of Fame 

In November 2011, Cricket Scotland introduced the legends of Scottish cricket, those people who played an integral part in the development of Scottish cricket.

 James Aitchison
 Jimmy Allan
 Dougie Barr
 Leslie Balfour
 Dougie Brown
 James Brown
 Mike Denness
 George Goddard
 Gavin Hamilton
 Brian Hardie
 John Kerr
 Gregor MacGregor
 Ian Peebles 
 Iain Philip
 Terence Racionzer
 George Salmond
 Robert Sievwright
 Colin Smith
 Ryan Watson
 Craig Wright

References

External links

Scotland
Sports governing bodies in Scotland
Cricket administration in Scotland
Organisations based in Edinburgh
1908 establishments in Scotland
Sports organizations established in 1908